Bleeder is the debut studio album by American heavy metal band Mutoid Man, released on June 30, 2015, through Sargent House.

Track listing

Style
Sonically, Bleeder contains influences of speed and thrash metal, early hardcore punk, rock'n'roll, NWOBHM, sludge metal, stoner rock, and psychedelic rock. Dan Caffrey from Consequence noted that Bleeder has a more polished sound than on Mutoid Man's debut EP Helium Head, where there is more emphasis on singing than "the constant yowl Brodsky put forth on Helium Head."

References

External links

2015 debut albums
Mutoid Man albums